Andali is an Arbëreshë comune and town is the province of Catanzaro in the Calabria region of southern Italy.

References

Arbëresh settlements
Cities and towns in Calabria